Siskel/Jacobs Productions is a Chicago, Illinois-based documentary and film-production company.

History 
Siskel/Jacobs Productions was founded in 2005 by filmmakers Jon Siskel and Greg Jacobs.
 Siskel is the nephew of film critic Gene Siskel.

Works 
The company produced the History Channel special 102 Minutes That Changed America, which premiered on September 11, 2008 and became the second-most watched program in the network's history. The company has also produced a special for Discovery Channel and an episode for the National Geographic Channel's Naked Science series. In 2008, SJP is worked on its first feature documentary, Louder Than a Bomb, which follows four Chicago-area high school poetry teams as they compete in the world's largest youth slam.

References 

 Amy Wilschke. "Taking Care Of Business: Independent Film Producers Are Doing It For Themselves", Screen Magazine.
 "No commercials during History Channel’s Sept. 11 airing of Siskel/Jacobs’ archive-driven 9/11 doc", ReelChicago.com (September 2, 2008).

Mass media companies established in 2005
Companies based in Chicago
Film production companies of the United States
Television production companies of the United States
Documentary film production companies
American companies established in 2005